Gupwell Pond is a pond  south of midmost Hoffman Ledge in the Labyrinth of Wright Valley, McMurdo Dry Valleys. It was named by the Advisory Committee on Antarctic Names (2004) after J.H. Gupwell, a drilling supervisor with the New Zealand drilling team during the McMurdo Dry Valleys Drilling Project, 1973–76.

References

Lakes of Victoria Land
McMurdo Dry Valleys